Adriaan Jacobus Van der Berg Coertzen (born 16 October 1990 in Bethlehem, South Africa) is a South African rugby union player for  in the Rugby Pro D2 in France. His regular position is winger or fullback.

Career

Youth rugby

Playing his high school rugby at Grey College in Bloemfontein, Coertzen was selected in the Free State squad that played at the Under-16 Grant Khomo Week tournament in 2006. In 2008, he was a member of the Free State's Under-18 Academy Week team. He progressed to the  side that played in the 2009 Under-19 Provincial Championship and then played for the  side in the 2011 Under-21 Provincial Championship.

Free State Cheetahs
Coertzen made his first class debut in the 2011 Vodacom Cup.

Griquas

After spending the 2015 Currie Cup qualification series on loan at Kimberley-based side  – making six appearances – he signed for them on a permanent basis for the 2016 season.

Aurillac

Coertzen moved to French Pro D2 side  after the 2018 Currie Cup Premier Division.

References

South African rugby union players
Living people
1990 births
Bethlehem
Rugby union wings
Rugby union fullbacks
Free State Cheetahs players
Rugby union players from the Free State (province)